Popeye domain-containing protein 3 is a protein that in humans is encoded by the POPDC3 gene.

Function 

This gene encodes a member of the POP family of proteins which contain three putative transmembrane domains. This membrane associated protein is predominantly expressed in skeletal and cardiac muscle, and may have an important function in these tissues.

References

Further reading